Charles Blair may refer to:
Charles Stanley Blair (1927–1980), United States federal judge
Charles F. Blair Jr. (1909–1978), United States Air Force general
Chandos Blair (1919–2011), general and former Defence Services Secretary
Chuck Blair (1928–2006), Canadian ice hockey player
Charles W. Blair (1829–1899), Union Army general
Charles A. Blair (1854–1912), member of the Michigan Supreme Court, 1905–1912
Charlie Walker-Blair (born 1992), English rugby union footballer